Avarkkopam  is a 2018 Malayalam film  directed by Ganesh Nair and script by Ajith N Nair, starring Parthasarathy Pillai, Nishad Joy, Tina Nair, Sunny Kalluppara, valsa Thoppil, Susy Mathew (Ruby).
Bindu Sundaran (Lisa Greenberg)

The film 'Avarkkoppam' featuring a central cast entirely of Malayali diaspora in the U.S. is an attempt to de-construct PTSD 
In life, there are pains and traumas that may be hard for others to empathise with. But a little care and support may go a long way to help alleviate the sufferings of the afflicted.

Plot
“Avarkkoppam is a journey of three families residing in a tri-State area (Connecticut, New York and New Jersey) who go through traumatic events and face difficulties in coping with their displaced lives. However, with time and tender loving care (TLC), they get better. Receiving effective treatment after PTSD symptoms develop can be critical in reducing them and improving life functions,”

Cast

 Dr. Sani - Bindu Kochunni
 Dr. Ananthan - Parthasarathy Pillai
 Ben - Nishad Joy
 Kuriakose - Sunny Kalluppara
 Lisa Greenberg - Bindu Sundaran
 Dr. John - Balu Menon
 Bens Mom- Valsa Thoppil
 Nurse Rachel - Rinta Roni
 Rani - Shiny George
 Dr. Anita - Tina Nair
 Dr. Nancy Chacko - Susy Mathew (Ruby)
 Chacko - Arvind G. Padmanabhan
 Sophie Koshy - Ezhil Queen 
 Dr. Roy - Ranil Radhakrishnan
 Dr. Tony - Amit Pullarkat
 Susan - Laisy Alex
 Annamma - Radhika Nettayi
 Radha Mukundan - Aliyamma
 Dr. Thommy - Francis Clement
 Father Paruthipara - Kochunni Kannannoor
 Nurse - Leena Thomas
 Hospital Receptionist-Jessica Philip
 Nurse - Joyce Joy

Production
The production of the movie was done by  Thrippadi Creations

Filming
The film was shot in the United States .

References

2018 films
2010s Malayalam-language films